Estadio Panamericano (Havana's Pan–American Stadium) is a multi-use stadium located near Cojimar, a city ward of Havana, Cuba. It is used mostly for athletics.

History
It was first used as the main stadium for the 1991 Pan American Games. The stadium opened August 1, 1991 and is able to hold 34,000.

It served as the site of an episode of the American version of Top Gear in 2016. The episode showed the stadium in disrepair and mostly abandoned.

Renovations
The stadium was renovated in 2008 with an artificial turf replacing the original grass turf.

Structure
The stadium is surrounded by a park and faces nearby Boca de Cojimar (Havana Bay).

Seating is mainly open air with a partially covered grandstand to the east side.

Surrounding the football field is an oval track.

See also
Estadio Latinoamericano
Estadio Pedro Marrero

References

External links

Football venues in Cuba
Athletics (track and field) venues in Cuba
Sports venues in Havana
Pan American Games opening ceremony stadiums
Pan American Games athletics venues
Venues of the 1991 Pan American Games
Sports venues completed in 1991
20th-century architecture in Cuba